The Tar-Baby is the second of the Uncle Remus stories published in 1881; it is about a doll made of tar and turpentine used by the villainous Br'er Fox to entrap Br'er Rabbit. The more that Br'er Rabbit fights the Tar-Baby, the more entangled he becomes.

In modern usage, tar-baby refers to a problematic situation that is only aggravated by additional involvement with it.

Publication history

A story originally published in Harper's Weekly by Robert Roosevelt, features Br'er Fox, who constructs a doll out of a lump of tar and dresses it with some clothes. When Br'er Rabbit comes along, he addresses the tar "baby" amiably, but receives no response. Br'er Rabbit becomes offended by what he perceives as the tar baby's lack of manners, punches it and, in doing so, becomes stuck. The more Br'er Rabbit punches and kicks the tar baby out of rage, the worse he gets stuck.

Now that Br'er Rabbit is stuck, Br'er Fox ponders how to dispose of him. The helpless but cunning Br'er Rabbit pleads, "Do anything you want with me – roas' me, hang me, skin me, drown me – but please, Br'er Fox, don't fling me in dat brier-patch", prompting the sadistic Br'er Fox to do exactly that because he gullibly believes it will inflict the maximum pain on Br'er Rabbit. However, as rabbits are at home in thickets like the brier-patch, the resourceful Br'er Rabbit escapes.

Years later Joel Chandler Harris wrote of the Tar-Baby in his Uncle Remus stories.

Analysis 
In folklore studies, the story of the Tar-Baby is classified in the international Aarne-Thompson-Uther Index as tale type ATU 175, "The Tar-Baby and the Rabbit".

Related stories 
Variations on the tar-baby legend are found in the folklore of more than one culture. In the Journal of American Folklore in 1943, Aurelio M. Espinosa discussed various different motifs within 267 versions of the tar-baby story that were ostensibly 'in his possession'. Espinosa used the existence of similar motifs to argue that the tar baby story and hundreds of other myths throughout the world, despite the significant variations between them, originate from a single ancient Indian myth. The next year, Archer Taylor added a list of tar baby stories from more sources around the world, citing scholarly claims of its earliest origins in India and Iran. Espinosa later published documentation on tar baby stories from a variety of language communities around the world.

Anthropologist Elsie Clews Parsons compiled an extensive list of references of the Tar Baby stories, from North American, Latin American and African publications on folklore.

A very similar West African tale is told of the mythical hero Anansi the Spider. In this version, Anansi creates a wooden doll and covers it over with gum, then puts a plate of yams in its lap, in order to capture the she-fairy Mmoatia (sometimes described as an "elf" or "dwarf"). Mmoatia takes the bait and eats the yams, but grows angry when the doll does not respond and strikes it, becoming stuck in the process.

From The Bahamas, the Tar-Baby story was published by The Journal of American Folklore in 1891 in Some Tales from Bahama Folk-Lore by Charles Lincoln Edwards. Edwards had collected the stories from Green Turtle Cay, Abaco in the summer of 1888. In the tale, B' Rabby refused to dig for water, and didn't help grow the field. He tricks B' Lizard and B' Bouki while they were standing watch by the water and the field. The other animals got tired of his tricks, got together and created a Tar Baby. B' Rabby was caught by Tar Baby and the other animals who wanted to throw him into the sea but he talked them into throwing him into a bush. They threw B' Rabby into the bush and he got away.

In a variant recorded in Jamaica, Anansi himself was once similarly trapped with a tar-baby made by the eldest son of Mrs. Anansi, after Anansi pretended to be dead in order to steal her peas. In a Spanish language version told in the mountainous parts of Colombia, an unnamed rabbit is trapped by the Muñeco de Brea (tar doll). A Buddhist myth tells of Prince Five-weapons (the future Buddha) who encounters the ogre Sticky-Hair in a forest.

The tar-baby theme is present in the folklore of various tribes of Meso-America and of South America: it is found in such stories as the Nahuatl (of Mexico) "Lazy Boy and Little Rabbit" (González Casanova 1946, pp. 55–67), Pipil (of El Salvador) "Rabbit and Little Fox" (Schultes 1977, pp. 113–116), and Palenquero (of Colombia) "Rabbit, Toad, and Tiger" (Patiño Rosselli 1983, pp. 224–229). In Mexico, the tar baby story is also found among Mixtec, Zapotec, and Popoluca. In North America, the tale appears in White Mountain Apache lore as "Coyote Fights a Lump of Pitch". In this story, white men are said to have erected the pitch-man that ensnares Coyote.

According to James Mooney in "Myths of the Cherokee", the tar-baby story may have been influenced in America by the Cherokee "Tar Wolf" story, considered unlikely to have been derived from similar African stories: "Some of these animal stories are common to widely separated [Native American] tribes among whom there can be no suspicion of [African] influences. Thus the famous "tar baby" story has variants, not only among the Cherokee, but also in New Mexico, Washington [State], and southern Alaska—wherever, in fact, the pine supplies enough gum to be molded into a ball for [Native American] uses".

In the Tar Wolf story, the animals were thirsty during a dry spell, and agreed to dig a well. The lazy rabbit refused to help dig, and so had no right to drink from the well. But she was thirsty, and stole from the well at night. The other animals fashioned a wolf out of tar and placed it near the well to scare the thief. The rabbit was scared at first, but when the tar wolf did not respond to her questions, she struck it and was held fast. Then she struggled with it and became so ensnared that she could not move. The next morning, the animals discovered the rabbit and proposed various ways of killing her, such as cutting her head off, and the rabbit responded to each idea saying that it would not harm her. Then an animal suggested throwing the rabbit into the thicket to die. At this, the rabbit protested vigorously and pleaded for her life. The animals threw the rabbit into the thicket. The rabbit then gave a whoop and bounded away, calling out to the other animals "This is where I live!"

Idiomatic references
The story has given rise to two American English idioms. References to Br'er Rabbit's feigned protestations such as "please don't fling me in dat brier-patch" refer to guilefully seeking something by pretending to protest, with a "briar patch" often meaning a more advantageous situation or environment for one of the parties. 

The term tar baby has come to refer to a problem that is exacerbated by attempts to struggle with it, or by extension to a situation in which mere contact can lead to becoming inextricably involved.

As a racial slur 
Although the term "tar baby" is documented as coming from a folktale of African origin, its modern meaning in America is different. Many consider tar baby to be a pejorative term for African Americans. Lexico lists tar baby as "a contemptuous term for a black person", the Oxford English Dictionary describes it as "a derogatory term for a Black (U.S.) or a Maori (N.Z.)", and The New Partridge Dictionary of Slang and Unconventional English lists it as an offensive term for a black person.

Several United States politicians—including presidential party nominees John Kerry, John McCain, Mitt Romney—have been criticized by civil rights leaders, the media, and fellow politicians for using the "tar baby" metaphor.
Linguist John McWhorter argued that people are "unaware that some consider it to have a second meaning as a slur" and it "is an obscure slur, not even known to be so by a substantial proportion of the population [...] those who feel that tar baby status as a slur is patently obvious are judging from the fact that it sounds like a racial slur".

See also 
 Cautionary tale
 Reverse psychology
 Wicked problem

References

Further reading 
 
 González Casanova, Pablo (1946) : Cuentos indígenas.
 Schultze Jena, Leonhard (1977) : Mito y Leyendas de los Pipiles de Izalco. El Salvador : Ediciones Cuscatlán.
 Patiño Rosselli, Carlos (1983) : Lengua y sociedad en el Panlenque de San Basilio. Bogotá : Instituto Caro y Cuervo.
 Wagner, Bryan (2017): The Tar Baby: A Global History. Princeton: Princeton University Press

External links
 
 
 
 Monkey and turtle story from Philippines
 Folktales of ATU type 175 by D. L. Ashliman

1881 short stories
American folklore
African-American cultural history
Anti-African and anti-black slurs
Problem solving
Br'er Rabbit
Song of the South characters
Rabbits and hares in literature
Literature featuring anthropomorphic foxes
Fictional dolls and dummies
Literary characters introduced in 1881
Characters in American novels of the 19th century